The Industrial Schools Act 1868 was an Act of Parliament which created Industrial Schools in Ireland to care for neglected, orphaned and abandoned children.

To prevent proselytism or changes in the religion of a child committed, Catholic and Protestant children were sent to separate schools.

See also
Industrial Schools in Ireland

References

External links

Hansard

United Kingdom Acts of Parliament 1868
Industrial schools